Smole is a Slovenian surname. Notable people with the surname include:

Dominik Smole (1929-1992), Slovenian writer and playwright
Janko Smole (1921–2010), Slovenian politician
Jože Smole (born 1965), Yugoslav Olympic cyclist

See also
Smolej

Slovene-language surnames